The pygmy flycatcher (Ficedula hodgsoni), also known as the pygmy blue-flycatcher, is a bird species of the family Muscicapidae.

Distribution and habitat
It is found in Bhutan, China, East Timor, India, Indonesia, Laos, Malaysia, Myanmar, Nepal, Thailand, and Vietnam. Its natural habitat is subtropical or tropical moist montane forests.

References

Further reading

pygmy flycatcher
Birds of Bhutan
Birds of Nepal
Birds of Northeast India
Birds of Southeast Asia
pygmy flycatcher
Taxonomy articles created by Polbot